A tattoo flash is a design printed or drawn on paper or cardboard, displayed on the walls of tattoo parlors and in binders to give walk-in customers ideas for tattoos. Traditional tattoo flash was designed for rapid tattooing and used in "street shops" — tattoo shops that handle a large volume of standardized tattoos for walk-in customers.

History 

The term "flash" is derived from the traveling carnival and circus trade in the late 1800s: an attraction needed to be eye-catching to draw in the crowd, and that visual appeal was called flash. Tattoo artists working at those carnivals would hang up their designs in front of their booths to catch people's attention, so they adopted "flash" as a term for this artwork.

The development of electric tattoo machines in the 1890s enabled faster and more precise tattooing. To fulfill increased demand for tattoos, especially sailor tattoos, artists began to buy and sell sets of pre-drawn designs. Many of these designs were relatively simple — with black outlines, limited colors, and limited shading — to enable quick work. Many common flash designs are still in this "old school" (American traditional) style.

Lew Alberts (1880-1954), known as Lew the Jew, was a prolific tattoo artist who created and sold many sheets of tattoo patterns. In 2009, a scholar wrote that a large amount of the conventional designs on the walls of contemporary shops were based on designs by Alberts.

In the 1980s there was a shift in iconography from badge-like images based on flash to customized large tattoos influenced by Polynesian and Japanese tattoo art, such as sleeves. By the year 2000, most tattoo studios had become custom shops, with the flash serving largely as a reference for ideas. Most tattoo designs are created by the tattoo artist developing an idea brought in by the customer.

Materials 
Flash is either drawn by the individual tattooist for display and use in their own studio, or traded and sold among other tattooists. Hand-drawn, local tattoo flash has been largely replaced by professional "flash artists" who produce prints of copyrighted flash to sell at conventions or through the Internet.

There is no standard size for tattoo flash, but it is most commonly found on 11x14 inch prints in North America. Tattoo flash may come with an outline, also known as a line drawing, printed on a separate sheet, so that tattoo artists do not need to draw the linework themselves.

References

Tattooing
Drawing aids